Scottish Parliament committees are small groups of Members of the Scottish Parliament (MSPs) who meet on a regular basis to scrutinise the work of the Scottish Government, conduct inquiries into subjects within their remit and examine legislation. Much of the everyday work of the Scottish Parliament is done by these committees. 

Committees play a more prominent role in the functioning of the Scottish Parliament than in many other comparable parliamentary systems. Partly this is intended to curb executive dominance, partly to empower backbench members as they carry out the work of scrutinising government, partly to encourage public and expert involvement, and partly due to the unicameral nature of the Scottish Parliament, meaning there is no revising chamber.

Some key committees, known as Mandatory committees, are required by the Scottish Parliament's Standing Orders and are established at the beginning of each session and their remits determined by parliamentary rules. Subject committees deal with a particular subject or area. Many of these Subject committees have been in place in one form or another since the formation of the Scottish Parliament, while others are quickly created and disbanded as circumstances require. A third type of committee may also be established to consider particular issues or pieces of legislation, especially private bills that have been submitted to parliament.

Committees usually have between five and ten MSPs as members, who are selected to reflect the balance of the political parties in parliament as a whole. Committee meetings are held in the committee rooms of the Scottish Parliament Building when parliament is sitting. Committees may also choose to meet at other locations throughout Scotland.

Conveners Group
The Conveners Group is not a committee in the ordinary sense, but is a forum where committee conveners meet to discuss the operation of committees and to liaise with other parliamentary bodies. The Conveners Group makes recommendations regarding the scheduling of committee business in the debating chamber and has the authority to allow committee meetings to take place in locations other than the Scottish Parliament Building. The Conveners Group is chaired by the Presiding Officer or their deputy.

Current committees

Mandatory
Mandatory committees are set down under the Scottish Parliament's Standing Orders, which govern their remits and proceedings. Mandatory committees are established at the beginning of each parliamentary session.

Citizen Participation and Public Petitions

Constitution, Europe, External Affairs and Culture

Delegated Powers and Law Reform

Equalities, Human Rights and Civil Justice

Finance and Public Administration

Public Audit

Standards, Procedures and Public Appointments

Subject

Subject committees are formed at the beginning of each parliamentary session. These committees typically correspond with one (or more) of the directorates or ministries of the Scottish Government. Additional Subject committees can be created as the need arises, such as the committee established in 2020 to examine the Scottish Government's response to the COVID-19 pandemic in Scotland.

COVID-19 Recovery

Criminal Justice

Economy and Fair Work

Education, Children and Young People

Health, Social Care and Sport

Local Government, Housing and Planning

Net Zero, Energy and Transport

Rural Affairs and Islands 

Social Justice and Social Security

Other
Issues not within the scope of the Mandatory or Subject committees, especially the examination of private bills, are considered by separate committees created solely for that purpose. Private bills typically relate to bills where the private interests of a person, group or organisation are the main focus of the bill (as opposed to being generally applicable across Scotland). 

Such Private bills have been used to legislate for large-scale development projects such as infrastructure projects that require the use of land or property. Such committees have in the past been set up to consider legislation and issues relating to the development of the Edinburgh Trams, the Glasgow Airport rail link, the Airdrie–Bathgate rail link and extensions to the Scottish National Gallery.

Separate committees have also been established to consider Hybrid bills. These are bill that have both a general application in law across Scotland, but also majorly affect the private interests of a specific person, group or organisation.

Previous committees

First session

Second session

Third session

Fourth session

Fifth session

See also
Scottish Government
Scottish Parliament
Member of the Scottish Parliament

References

External links
Scottish Parliament official site of the Scottish Parliament

Scottish Parliament
Scottish
Scotland politics-related lists